Bullimus is a genus of rodent from the Philippines, as first catalogued by Mearns, in 1905.

Species
Genus Bullimus
Bagobo rat, Bullimus bagobus, Mindanao
Carleton's forest rat, Bullimus carletoni, Luzon - Described in 2021.
Camiguin forest rat, Bullimus gamay, Camiguin
Large Luzon forest rat, Bullimus luzonicus, Luzon

References

 
Rodent genera
Taxa named by Edgar Alexander Mearns
Bullimus